Diarmaid Murtagh (born 28 July 1982) is an Irish actor. He portrayed Leif in the 2013 historical drama television series Vikings, Dimitri in Dracula Untold (2014) and Captain Harpen in The Monuments Men (2014).

Biography
Murtagh was born on 28 July 1982 in Kingscourt, Republic of Ireland.

He first appeared in the 2007 Irish soap opera Ros na Rún. His debut film role was as Captain Harpen in the George Clooney's 2014 war film The Monuments Men. Murtagh played convict Frank Mitchell in the 2019 film The Krays' Mad Axeman.

He is currently starring in Troy: Fall of a City as Hermes, messenger of Olympus. He is currently featured as “Connor” in the Netflix sci fi drama The one.

References

External links

1982 births
21st-century Irish male actors
Irish male film actors
Living people